Toowong was an electoral district of the Legislative Assembly in the Australian state of Queensland from 1888 to 1992. It was centred on the Northern Brisbane suburb of Toowong.

Redistributions over the years extended Toowong toward Mt Coot-tha and Moggill, and it shrank back toward the populated areas when Mt Coot-tha was given its own district.

Toowong was abolished in the 1991 redistribution, and its territories were absorbed into the districts of Mt Coot-tha and Indooroopilly.

Members for Toowong

Election results

See also
 Electoral districts of Queensland
 Members of the Queensland Legislative Assembly by year
 :Category:Members of the Queensland Legislative Assembly by name

References

Former electoral districts of Queensland
1888 establishments in Australia
1992 disestablishments in Australia
Constituencies established in 1888
Constituencies disestablished in 1932